Bogø is a Danish island in the Baltic Sea, just west of Møn. The population is 1,200 (1 January 2022) with 951 living in the only town on the island, Bogø By. The island is approximately 7 km long by 3 km wide at the largest points, with a total area of 13 km2.  Maximum height above sea level is 32 metres.

To the west of Bogø is a smaller island, Farø, which carries the E47/E55 motorway from Copenhagen to the major islands of Lolland and Falster. The routes continue via ferry to Germany. Bogø is connected by causeways to both Farø and Møn, and carries one of the two main routes for vehicles travelling to Møn. It is part of Vordingborg Municipality.

The island has a varied landscape including wooded areas and traditional villages. To the northwest of the island at Skåninge is a small harbour and bathing jetty. To the south east is a larger harbour with a car ferry which operates during summer months to Stubbekøbing on Falster. Near the centre of the island is a preserved windmill from 1852, which is being restored to form a working museum.

The island was for a long time part of the crown estates. In 1769 it was offered for sale, and purchased by the islanders for 18,456 rigsdaler. To pay for this, the islanders cut down much of the forest then growing on the island.

Hulehøj
In the north east of the island, in the wooded region, is a well preserved passage grave at Hulehøj. The burial chamber is 6.3m long, originally accessed via a 5.5m tunnel. This passage grave is estimated to have been built about 3200 BC in the Nordic Stone Age. The stones weigh up to 10 tons and were apparently moved and lifted by rollers, sledges and lifting bars when constructed. Hule means hollow, and høj, from the Old Norse word haugr, means hill or mound.

Cultural references
The Bogø-Stubbekøbing ferry is used as a location at 1:11:31 in the first Olsen Gang film.

Gallery

Notable people 
 Cecilie Thomsen (born 1974 in Bogø) a Danish actress and model

See also 

 List of islands of Denmark

References

External links
 The history of Bogø
 The church and parish house of Bogø

Islands of Denmark
Funnelbeaker culture
Danish islands in the Baltic
Geography of Vordingborg Municipality